Methanedisulfonic acid is the organosulfur compound with the formula CH2(SO3H)2.  It is the disulfonic acid of methane.  It is prepared by treatment of methanesulfonic acid with oleum.  Its acid strength (pKa) is comparable to that of sulfuric acid.

See also
Ethanedisulfonic acid
1,3-Propanedisulfonic acid

References

Sulfonic acids